Gordon G. Hammes (born 1934 in Fond du Lac, Wisconsin) is a distinguished service professor of biochemistry, emeritus, at Duke University, professor emeritus at Cornell University, and member of United States National Academy of Sciences. Hammes' research involves the study of enzyme mechanisms and enzyme regulation.

Early life and education
Hammes was born in Fond du Lac, Wisconsin in 1934. He earned his B.A. from Princeton University in 1956 and his Ph.D. from the University of Wisconsin-Madison in 1959.

Career
Hammes conducted postdoctoral research with Manfred Eigen at the Max Planck Institute for Biophysical Chemistry in Göttingen, Germany. He then secured a faculty position at the Massachusetts Institute of Technology before moving to Cornell University in 1965, where he was professor and chair of the department of chemistry.  At Cornell University, he was the Horace White Professor of Chemistry and Biochemistry, as well the director and co-founder of the Cornell University Biotechnology Program.  He spent some time at the University of California, Santa Barbara as vice-chancellor for academic affairs, and then joined the biochemistry faculty at Duke University in 1991. He served as vice chancellor of academic affairs at the Duke University Medical Center from 1991 through 1998.

Hammes was editor-in-chief of the American Chemical Society journal Biochemistry from 1992 until 2003, and president of the American Society for Biochemistry and Molecular Biology starting in 1994. The Gordon Hammes ACS Biochemistry Lectureship was established in 2009 in order to honor significant contributions to the field of biochemistry.

Rsearch papers
Dr. Hammes is a world leader in the field of enzyme mechanisms and regulation, starting with work with Eigen on the temperature-jump technique and with Robert Alberty on relaxation spectra. He studied the kinetic behavior of various enzymes, including glutamate-aspartate transaminase, hexokinase, and ribonuclease. He developed new methodologies that allowed a better understanding of enzyme catalysis, including fast reaction techniques, fluorescence spectroscopy, and single molecule microscopy. He was also one of the first to develop fluorescence energy transfer (FRET) as a technology to study distances between and within proteins. His work revolutionized the understanding of conformational changes and multiple intermediates in enzyme catalysis. Dr. Hammes has published more than 250 scientific articles.

Books

Books written by Hammes include the following:

Thermodynamics and Kinetics for the Biological Sciences (2000)

Spectroscopy for the Biological Sciences (2005)

Physical Chemistry for the Biological Sciences (2015) with his daughter Sharon Hammes-Schiffer

Awards and distinctions
1956 – McKay Prize in Chemistry
1967 – American Chemical Society Award in Biological Chemistry
1967 – Eli Lilly Award in Biological Chemistry
2002 – American Society for Biochemistry and Molecular Biology William C. Rose Award
2008 – American Chemical Society Biochemistry Lectureship, Scholarship Award created in 2016
2009 – Vallee Foundation board of directors

Other accomplishments
2009 – Slew Hester Male Player of the Year, United States Tennis Association, Southern
2009 – Walt Stamer Senior Male Tennis Player of the Year, United States Tennis Association, North Carolina
2016 – Captain, USA Team, Gardner Mulloy Cup World Team Champions
2017 – Member, USA Team, Gardner Mulloy Cup World Team Champions

References

1934 births
Living people
Members of the United States National Academy of Sciences
21st-century American chemists
Cornell University faculty
Duke University faculty
People from Fond du Lac, Wisconsin
Princeton University alumni
University of Wisconsin–Madison alumni